David or Dave Hayes may refer to:
David Hayes (sculptor) (1931–2013), American sculptor
David J. Hayes (born 1953), U.S. Deputy Secretary of the Interior
David A. Hayes (born 1962), Australian Thoroughbred racehorse trainer 
David Hayes (author) (born 1953), Canadian writer
David Hayes (conductor) (born 1963), music director of the Philadelphia Singers
David S. Hayes (born 1941), Pennsylvania politician
David Hayes (soccer) (born 1976), player for FC Tampa Bay
David Hayes (musician), bass guitar player
David Hayes (hurler), Irish hurler
David Hayes, owner of Very Small Records
Dave Hayes (American football) (1896–1956), American football player
Dave Hayes (politician) (born 1966), American politician in the Washington House of Representatives
David Hayes (Australian footballer) (born 1949), Australian footballer for Melbourne FC

See also
David Hays (disambiguation)
David Hay (disambiguation)
David Haye (born 1980), British boxer
David Heyes (born 1946), British MP